The Egebergs Ærespris ("Honorary Prize of Egeberg") is a prize awarded to Norwegian athletes who excel in more than one sport. The prize was created by Ferdinand Julian Egeberg, and consists of a bronze statuette modelled by sculptor Magnus Vigrestad.

History
His donation was basis for the sports prize Kabinetskammerherre Egebergs ærespris for alsidig idrett. The statutes for the award were agreed on 10 February 1920. The basic capital was not to be touched, while the fund's interests should be used for a prize given to a sportsperson who, during the last two years, had excelled in one sport and also showed eminent performances in another, completely different sport. The prize is a bronze statuette modelled by sculptor Magnus Vigrestad, who won the design competition. The prize was regarded the highest achievement in Norwegian sport at the time. The statutes have changed slightly over the years. Today the prize is awarded by the Norwegian Olympic and Paralympic Committee and Confederation of Sports, and given to Norwegian sports people who have excelled nationally in at least two sports, and excelled internationally in at least one of these. The first awardee was skier and football player Gunnar Andersen, who received the prize for 1918. The first female recipient was Laila Schou Nilsen, who received the prize for 1936 for her achievements in skiing, speed-skating and tennis. In 1983 Cato Zahl Pedersen received the prize (for 1981) for disabled sports.

Award winners
The award has been given to the following athletes:
1918 Gunnar Andersen - football and ski jumping
1919 Helge Løvland - track and field and gymnastics
1921 Harald Strøm - speed skating and football
1922 Ole Reistad - cross-country skiing and track and field
1926 Johan Støa - cross-country skiing and track and field
1928 Bernt Evensen - speed skating and cycling
1929 Armand Carlsen - speed skating and cycling
1929 Reidar Jørgensen - cross-country skiing and track and field
1931 Fritjof Bergheim - gymnastics and track and field
1934 Otto Berg - gymnastics and track and field
1935 Bjarne Bryntesen - cross-country skiing and track and field
1936 Laila Schou Nilsen - cross-country skiing, speed skating and tennis
1937 Johan Haanes - tennis and cross-country skiing
1938 Henry Johansen - cross-country skiing and football
1939 Arne Larsen - cross-country skiing and track and field
1946 Godtfred Holmvang - athletics and alpine skiing
1947 Sverre Farstad - speed skating and weightlifting
1949 Martin Stokken - cross-country skiing and track and field
1950 Egil Lærum - cross-country skiing and football
1951 Hjalmar Andersen - speed skating and cycling
1952 Hallgeir Brenden - cross-country skiing and track and field
1956 Roald Aas - speed skating and cycling
1960 Reidar Andreassen - cross-country skiing and track and field
1961 Arne Bakker - football and bandy
1962 Magnar Lundemo - cross-country skiing and track and field
1965 Ole Ellefsæter - cross-country skiing and track and field
1967 Fred Anton Maier - speed skating and cycling
1969 Frithjof Prydz - tennis and ski jumping
1971 Bjørn Wirkola - ski jumping and football
1973 Ivar Formo - cross-country skiing and orienteering
1975 Eystein Weltzien - orienteering and cross-country skiing
1980 Bjørg Eva Jensen - speed skating and cycling
1981 Cato Zahl Pedersen - disabled sports
1987 Oddvar Brå - cross-country skiing and track and field
1988 Ragnhild Bratberg - cross-country skiing and orienteering
1990 Grete Ingeborg Nykkelmo – cross-country skiing and biathlon
1991 Birger Ruud – ski jumping and alpine skiing
1992 Ingrid Kristiansen - track and field and cross-country skiing
1996 Anita Andreassen - mushing, cycling and cross-country skiing
2000 Anette Bøe - cross-country skiing, triathlon, mountain biking and ice hockey
2001 Anders Aukland — cross-country skiing, triathlon, sled dog racing and track and field
2002 Ole Einar Bjørndalen - biathlon and cross-country skiing
2002 Hilde Gjermundshaug Pedersen - ski orienteering and cross-country skiing
2004 Trond Einar Elden – Nordic combined, cross-country skiing and track and field
2005 Stein Johnson – former multi-sports coach
2006 Lars Berger - biathlon and cross-country skiing
2009 Frode Andresen - biathlon and cross-country skiing
2009 Helge Bjørnstad - sledge hockey and swimming (disability sports)
2010 Jens Arne Svartedal - cross-country skiing and duathlon
2011 Kristin Størmer Steira - cross-country skiing and track and field
2012 Odd-Bjørn Hjelmeset - cross-country skiing and track and field
2013 Mariann Vestbøstad Marthinsen - sitski and swimming
2015 Astrid Uhrenholdt Jacobsen  - cross-country skiing and Track and field
2018 Nils Erik Ulset - biathlon and cross-country skiing (disability sports)
2019 Birgit Skarstein - rowing and cross-country skiing

References

External links
 Verdensmester reagerer: – Hvis vi skal holde på sånn, kan vi bare legge ned antidopingarbeidet [World champion reacts: – If we are going to continue like this, then we might just as well retire (all) anti-doping effort] (4 December 2020) NRK

Norwegian sports trophies and awards